or (1901–1982) was the nom de guerre for Mitsugi Seguchi (瀬口 貢 Seguchi Mitsugi), a Japanese writer, literary critic, and political activist.

Biography

Wataru Kaji was born in Kyushu in 1903. He became involved with activism. Kaji was charged with violating the Peace Preservation Law and threatening the Kokutai, resulting in his flight to China in January 1936. He arrived in Shanghai, where he married Yuki Ikeda. In Shanghai, Kaji was placed under suspicion for working with Japanese socialists by Chiang Kai-shek's Nationalist government.

While in China, Kaji met Lu Xun, Hu Feng, Xiao Hong. Edgar Snow, and Koji Ariyoshi. In December 1939, Kaji founded the Japanese People's Anti-war Alliance.

 
Kaji and Ikeda fled Shanghai following the outbreak of the Second Sino-Japanese War. Kaji worked for the Chinese, and re-educated Japanese POWs.

Kaji was kidnapped in 1951 by U.S intelligence, and was held for more than a year.

Wataru Kaji died when he was 79 years old.

Legacy 
The Chinese Documentary series "Today In The History Of Anti-Japanese War" dedicated an episode to Kaji.

Wataru Kaji was featured in the "International Friends during the Anti-Japanese War". A show organized by the Beijing People's Association for Friendship with Foreign Countries. The show "features 160 pictures of 39 foreign friends who worked together with the Chinese people and made contributions to China's independence and freedom."

See also 
Teru Hasegawa
Japanese dissidence during the Shōwa period
Japanese in the Chinese resistance to the Empire of Japan
Japanese People's Anti-war Alliance

References

Further reading

Records of the Office of Strategic Services (Record Group 226) 1940-1947 | Entry 211 | Boxes 1-45. Location: 250/64/32/1. CIA Accession: 85-0215R. at the National Archives and Records Administration

External links

1900s births
1982 deaths
Japanese rebels
People of the Second Sino-Japanese War